"When You Need Me" is a song performed and written by American R&B musician Aaron Hall, issued as the second single from his 1994 solo debut album The Truth. Released in the United States of America.

Charts

Credits
Lyrics By – Aaron Hall III
Backing Vocals - Hershel Boone
Music By – Vassal Benford
Remix - Aaron Hall, Vassal Benford
Producer, Instruments, Programmed By – Vassal Benford

References

External links

1993 songs
1994 singles
Aaron Hall (singer) songs
Geffen Records singles
Songs written by Aaron Hall (singer)
Songs written by Vassal Benford
Contemporary R&B ballads
1990s ballads